Sociedade Esportiva e Cultural Terra e Mar Clube, commonly known as Terra e Mar, is a Brazilian football club based in Fortaleza, Ceará state.

History
The club was founded on June 1, 1938. Terra e Mar was founded in Mucuripe neighborhood. The team won the Campeonato Cearense Third Level in 2009.

Achievements
 Campeonato Cearense Third Level:
 Winners (1): 2009

Stadium
Sociedade Esportiva e Cultural Terra e Mar Clube play their home games at Estádio Luiz Cesário. The stadium has a maximum capacity of 3,500 people.

References

Association football clubs established in 1938
Football clubs in Ceará
1938 establishments in Brazil